Albemarle County is a county located in the Piedmont region of the Commonwealth of Virginia.  Its county seat is Charlottesville, which is an independent city and enclave entirely surrounded by the county. Albemarle County is part of the Charlottesville Metropolitan Statistical Area. As of the 2020 census, the population was 112,395.

Albemarle County was created in 1744 from the western portion of Goochland County, though portions of Albemarle were later carved out to create other counties.  Albemarle County was named in honor of Willem Anne van Keppel, 2nd Earl of Albemarle.  Its most famous inhabitant was Thomas Jefferson, who built his estate home, Monticello, in the county.

History 

At the time of European encounter, the inhabitants of the area that became Albemarle County were a Siouan-speaking tribe called the Saponi.
In 1744, the Virginia General Assembly created Albemarle County from the western portion of Goochland County. The county was named in honor of Willem Anne van Keppel, 2nd Earl of Albemarle and titular Governor of Virginia at the time. The large county was partitioned in 1761, forming Buckingham and Amherst counties, at which time the county seat was moved from the formerly central Scottsville to a piece of newly central land, christened Charlottesville. In 1777, Albemarle County was divided and Fluvanna County established, finalizing the boundaries of modern Albemarle County.

Albemarle County is well known for its association with President and Founding Father Thomas Jefferson, who was born in the county at Shadwell, though it was then part of Goochland County. However, his home of Monticello is located in the county. When the American Revolutionary War started in 1775, Jefferson was made colonel of the Albemarle Militia.

During the Civil War, the Battle of Rio Hill was a skirmish in which Union cavalry raided a Confederate camp in Albemarle County, Virginia.

Until the Civil War, the majority of Albemarle County's population consisted of enslaved African Americans.

Geography

Waterways
The Rivanna River's south fork forms in Albemarle County and was historically important for transportation. The south fork flows in-between Darden Towe Park and Pen Park. Boat ramp access is available at Darden Towe Park. The James River acts as a natural border between Albemarle and Buckingham Counties.

Major highways

Protected areas
Albemarle's western border with Augusta and Rockingham Counties is located within the Shenandoah National Park.

Adjacent counties

Albemarle County borders 8 other counties, more than any other county in Virginia.

Charlottesville, Virginia (surrounded by Albemarle County)
Greene County, Virginia (north)
Orange County, Virginia (northeast)
Louisa County, Virginia (east)
Fluvanna County, Virginia (southeast)
Buckingham County, Virginia (south)
Nelson County, Virginia (southwest)
Augusta County, Virginia (west)
Rockingham County, Virginia (northwest)

Parks and recreation 
 Beaver Creek Lake
 Brook Hill Park
Chris Greene Lake Park
Darden Towe Park
Dorrier Park
Charlotte Y. Humphris Park
Ivy Creek Natural Area
Mint Springs Valley Park
Patricia Ann Byrom Forest Preserve Park
Preddy Creek Park
 Simpson Park
 Totier Creek Park
 Walnut Creek Park
 Western Park

Demographics

2020 census

Note: the US Census treats Hispanic/Latino as an ethnic category. This table excludes Latinos from the racial categories and assigns them to a separate category. Hispanics/Latinos can be of any race.

2010 Census
The largest self-reported ancestry groups in Albemarle County are English 16.3%, German 16.0%, Irish 12.7%, "American" 11.4% and Italian 5.2%.

As of the census of 2010, there were 98,970 people, 38,157 households, and 24,578 families residing in the county. The population density was 137 people per square mile (52.8/km2). There were 42,122 housing units at an average density of 58 per square mile (22.4/km2). The racial makeup of the county was 80.6% White, 9.7% Black or African American, 0.3% Native American, 4.7% Asian, 0.1% Pacific Islander, 2.3% from other races, and 2.4% from two or more races. 5.5% of the population were Hispanic or Latino of any race.

There were 38,157 households, out of which 28.2% had children under the age of 18 living with them, 51.4% were married couples living together, 9.6% had a female householder with no husband present, and 35.6% were non-families. 28.0% of all households were made up of individuals, and 25.9% had someone living alone who was 65 years of age or older. The average household size was 2.41 and the average family size was 2.96.

In the county, the population was spread out, with 21.5% under the age of 18, 12.3% from 18 to 24, 24.7% from 25 to 44, 27.2% from 45 to 64, and 14.3% who were 65 years of age or older. The median age was 38.2 years. For every 100 females there were 92.69 males. For every 100 females age 18 and over, there were 89.59 males.

22% of Albemarle residents have a graduate or professional degree, compared with 10% nationwide.

The median income for a household in the county was $63,001, and the median income for a family was $98,934. Males had a median income of $55,530 versus $52,211 for females. The per capita income for the county was $36,718. About 3.8% of families and 10.4% of the population were below the poverty line, including 8.0% of those under age 18 and 2.4% of those age 65 or over.

Economy 

35% of people working in Albemarle live in the county, while 65% commute in. 19% of those commuting in live in Charlottesville, while the remainder live in the surrounding counties. 26,800 people commute out of Albemarle for work. 48% of those commute to Charlottesville, making up 51% of Charlottesville's in-commuters. In 2018, Albemarle had a 2.7% unemployment rate, compared with a national rate of 3.9%.

The top 10 employers as of Q2 2019 were:
 University of Virginia
 County of Albemarle
 Sentara Healthcare
U.S. Department of Defense
State Farm Mutual Automobile Insurance
 Atlantic Coast Athletic Club
Piedmont Virginia Community College
Northrop Grumman Corporation
Crutchfield Corporation
Walmart

36% of workers in Albemarle are employed by the government, with 898 working for the federal government, 12,476 working for the state government (including the University of Virginia), and 4,127 working for the local government.

Government
Albemarle is governed by an elected six-member Board of Supervisors. Management of the county is vested in a Board-appointed County Executive.

There are also several elected Constitutional Officers:
 Clerk of the Circuit Court: John Zug (D)
 Commonwealth's Attorney: James M. Hingeley (D)
 Sheriff: Chan Bryant (D)

The nonpartisan School Board is also elected.  Its members are:

Kate Acuff (Jack Jouett Magisterial District)
Katrina Callsen (Rio Magisterial District)
Judy Le (Rivanna Magisterial District)
Graham Paige (Chair, Samuel Miller Magisterial District)
Ellen Osborne (Scottsville Magisterial District)
David Oberg (White Hall Magisterial District)
Jonno Alcaro (At-Large)

Emergency services

Albemarle County has two branches of law enforcement, the Albemarle County Police Department, which handles criminal matters and is directed by the appointed police chief, Colonel Sean Reeves. The second branch is the Albemarle County Sheriff's Office, which handles civil service in the county and they are directed by the elected Sheriff Chan Bryant.

EMS services are provided by three volunteer rescue squads and Albemarle County Fire Rescue. The Charlottesville-Albemarle Rescue Squad, located in the City of Charlottesville, providing 24hr EMS services to the City of Charlottesville and on nights and weekends in particular areas of the county, the Western Albemarle Rescue Squad, located in Crozet, and the Scottsville Volunteer Rescue Squad, located in the town of Scottsville. Albemarle County Fire Rescue operates 6 Advance Life Support ambulances, Medic 4 (Earlysville), Medic 8 (Seminole), Medic 11 (Monticello), Medic 12 (Hollymead), Medic 15 (Ivy), and Medic 16 (Pantops).

Albemarle County Fire/Rescue system is a combination system that consists of seven volunteer fire stations and three career fire stations (Hollymead, Ivy and Monticello). Three of the volunteer stations (stations 3, 5, and 7) are covered 24 hours a day by volunteers. The other volunteer stations (2, 4, 6, and 8) are supplemented by career staff Monday - Friday, 6AM - 6PM. Volunteers operate these stations weeknights from 6PM - 6AM as well as weekends and holidays. The three career stations are staffed 24 hours by both career and volunteer firefighters Volunteer and career firefighters are trained and work together to provide Fire and EMS services to the population of Albemarle County.

Albemarle County Fire Rescue has begun building a station (Station 16) in the eastern portion of the county near Pantops slated to open in Fall of 2018.

Fire stations
 Crozet Volunteer Fire Department (Station 5)
 Earlysville Volunteer Fire Company (Station 4)
 East Rivanna Volunteer Fire Company (Station 2)
 Hollymead Fire Rescue (Station 12)
 Ivy Fire Rescue (Station 15)
 Monticello Fire Rescue (Station 11)
 North Garden Volunteer Fire Company (Station 3)
 Pantops Fire Rescue (Station 16)
 Scottsville Volunteer Fire Department (Station 7)
 Seminole Trail Volunteer Fire Department (Station 8)
 Stony Point Volunteer Fire Company (Station 6)

Rescue squads
 Charlottesville-Albemarle Rescue Squad (Rescue 1)
 Albemarle County Fire and Rescue  Station 17 (Scottsville)
 Western Albemarle Rescue Squad (Rescue 5)

Law enforcement 
The Albemarle County Sheriff's Office (ACSO) and the Albemarle County Police Department (ACPD) provide law enforcement services in the county.

The ACSO was created in 1745 when Joseph Thompson was appointed as the first sheriff. Then in 1895, citizens started electing sheriffs for 4-year terms. Lucian Watts was the first elected sheriff.  the sheriff is Chan Bryant, the county's first woman sheriff.

The ACPD was created in 1983. Prior to 1983, local county governments could create a police force by a simple vote held by their respective board of supervisors. In February 1983 the Virginia General Assembly restricted the authority of county governments to create police forces without a voter referendum. The law did not go into effect until July 1983: On May 11, 1983, before the law took effect, the Albemarle County Board of Supervisors passed an ordinance creating the Albemarle County Police Department. That original ordinance provided for a police chief and five full time officers. George W. Bailey was the first chief of police.  the chief of police is Sean Reeves. The ACPD currently has 140 sworn officers, 23 civilian employees, and 3 animal control officers.

Representation & elections 
Albemarle is represented by Republican Bryce Reeves and Democrat Creigh Deeds in the Virginia State Senate; Republicans Chris Runion, Rob Bell, and Matt Fariss and Democrat Sally L. Hudson represent the county in the Virginia House of Delegates.  Republican Bob Good represents most of the county in the U.S. House of Representatives. Democrat Abigail Spanberger represents a small sliver in the most Northwest portion of Albemarle County.

For much of the second half of the 20th century, Albemarle County was heavily Republican, like most of this part of Virginia. However, the Republican edge narrowed significantly in the 1990s, in part due to the influence of the University of Virginia. In 2004, John Kerry carried it by two points, becoming the first Democrat to win the county since 1948. It swung hard to Barack Obama in 2008, and since then has become one of the few Democratic bastions in central Virginia, though it is not as overwhelmingly Democratic as Charlottesville.

Education
The Albemarle County Public School System operates public education in the county. It provides education to nearly 14,000 students including preschool through high school. The Albemarle County Public School System's mission is to "establish a community of learners and learning, through relationships, relevance and rigor, one student at a time." ACPS provides 25 school facilities which include Community Lab School, a charter school that is located in the City of Charlottesville, Albemarle High School, Western Albemarle High School, and Monticello High School. The School Board and the Superintendent, Dr. Matthew Haas, work closely together in operating the Albemarle County Public School System.

Many private schools in Albemarle serve the county and students from surrounding areas. These include:

The Covenant School (upper campus)
Field School of Charlottesville
Free Union Country School
The Miller School of Albemarle
Montessori Community School
North Branch School
Peabody School
Charlottesville Catholic School
St. Anne's-Belfield School
Tandem Friends School

Some students attend several private schools in the City of Charlottesville.

Jefferson-Madison Regional Library is the regional library system that provides services to the citizens of Albemarle.

Communities
The city of Charlottesville is enclaved within Albemarle County. Under Virginia law in effect since 1871, all municipalities in the state incorporated as cities are legally and politically independent of any county.

(Population according to the 2020 United States Census)

Many of these unincorporated areas have Charlottesville addresses.

Notable people
 Samuel Addison Bishop, born in Albemarle County, was a settler of the Owens Valley and is the namesake of Bishop Creek in Inyo County, California.

Notable residents

Chilton Allan (1786–1858), born in Albemarle County, United States Congressman from Kentucky
Rev Samuel Black, Albemarle County's first Presbyterian minister. Built Sam Black's Tavern
Dabney Smith Carr (1802–1854), born in Albemarle County, founder of newspaper Baltimore Republican and Commercial Advertiser, United States minister to Turkey
Christopher Henderson Clark (1767–1828), United States Congressman from Virginia
George Rogers Clark (1752–1818), surveyor, soldier, and Revolutionary War hero and older brother of William Clark born in Albemarle County
William Coleman, Olympic equestrian team member 2012
Edward Coles (1786–1868), born in Albemarle County, Governor of Illinois
Rita Dove (1952- ), former United States Poet Laureate and winner of the Pulitzer Prize for poetry, living in Albemarle County since 1989
Greensville Dowell (1822–1876), born in Albemarle County, noted physician, professor, and author
Kathryn Erskine, National Book Award-winning novelist
James T. Farley (1829–1886), born in Albemarle County, United States Senator from California
James Walker Gons (1812–1870), born in Albemarle County, Baptist church clergyman, later converting to Christian Church (Disciples of Christ), editor and publisher of church's Christian Intelligencer, educator.
John Grisham, author of The Whistler and A Time to Kill
Claude Hall, historian who wrote definitive biography of Abel Parker Upshur
John Harvie (1742–1807), born in Albemarle County, member of the Continental Congress and mayor of Richmond, Virginia from 1785 to 1786
Samuel Hopkins (1753–1819), born in Albemarle County, United States Army officer and United States Congressman from Kentucky
Thomas Jefferson, third President of the United States and former Governor of Virginia
Sarah Garland Boyd Jones (1866–1905), physician
Jack Jouett (1754–1822), born in Albemarle County, known as the "Paul Revere of the South", influential in organizing Kentucky as a separate state, Virginia and Kentucky state legislator
Fiske Kimball (1888–1955), architectural historian, founder of the University of Virginia School of Architecture
Ben King (cyclist), professional cyclist
Walter Leake (1769?-1825), born in Albemarle County, United States Senator from Mississippi and later governor of that state
Meriwether Lewis (1774–1809), born in Albemarle County, explorer, governor of Louisiana, and one of the leaders of the Lewis and Clark Expedition
Howie Long, former NFL player with the Oakland Raiders
Joseph Martin (1740–1808), Revolutionary War general and explorer; namesake of Martinsville, Virginia
Dave Matthews of the Dave Matthews Band
David Meriwether, born in Albemarle County, Continental Army officer, member United States Congress, Speaker of the Georgia House of Representatives, Major General - Georgia Militia
James Monroe, fifth President of the United States and former Governor of Virginia
James Monroe (1799–1870), born in Albemarle County, United States Congressman from New York
Lottie Moon (1840–1912), Southern Baptist missionary to China; Southern Baptists worldwide take up a Christmas offering every year for international missions in her name
John Milbank, English Philosopher and Theologian 
Sissy Spacek, actress
Peter Threewits (1725-1770), born in Sussex County, Virginia state legislator
Bebe Williams, Xeric Award cartoonist/artist Art Comics Daily

See also

National Register of Historic Places listings in Albemarle County, Virginia

References

Further reading

External links 

Architecture of Jefferson Country – images of historic buildings of Albemarle County (from UVA Libraries)

 
Virginia counties
1744 establishments in the Thirteen Colonies
Counties on the James River (Virginia)
Community Remembrance Project